Serres Football Club (Greek: Μ.Γ.Σ. Εθνικός Γαζώρου) is a Greek football club, based in Serres.

The association was founded in 1951 as Ethnikos Gazoros. In the 2011-12 season the club became champion Gazoros Group C Northern League (Football League 2) and is currently participating in the Football League, with temporary headquarters in Serres Municipal Stadium.

Honours

 Football League 2:
 Winners (1): 2012

References

External links

Football clubs in Central Macedonia
Serres
Association football clubs established in 1951
1951 establishments in Greece